The Book of Gad the Seer is a presumed lost text, supposed to have been written by the biblical prophet Gad, which is mentioned at 1 Chronicles. The passage reads: "Now the acts of David the king, first and last, behold, they are written in the book of Samuel the seer, and in the book of Nathan the prophet, and in the book of Gad the seer."

Pseudepigraphic book of the same name
There is a pseudepigraphic book by the same title, extant in the form of a manuscript from the Black Jews of Cochin, India. The manuscript now in the Cambridge Library is a relatively recent (19th century) copy. According to Solomon Schechter, this manuscript is copied from a document purporting to be from Rome, and the late linguistic forms and features of the Hebrew manuscript, as well as its substantial similarity with some medieval Kabbalistic literature and some aspects of Christianity, indicate a relatively late date. He regards it therefore as not dating back to antiquity. However, according to Professor Meir Bar Ilan, although some linguistic aspects of the Hebrew manuscript are of late date, there is evidence that the book originated in approximately the 1st or 2nd century A.D.

A scholarly edition of the book was published in August 2015, edited by Professor Meir Bar Ilan of Bar Ilan University. The book also includes an English translation of the original text.

See also 
 Lost work
 Non-canonical books referenced in the Bible
 Table of books of Judeo-Christian Scripture

References

External links
 Israel Abrahams, The Words of Gad the Seer, appeared in 

1st-century books
2nd-century books
Books of Chronicles
Cochin Jews
Jewish apocrypha
Lost Jewish texts
Old Testament pseudepigrapha